is a Japanese gravure idol and fashion model. She made her debut in Eternal in 2004.

She is a graduate of Miyagi Gakuin Women's University.

Personal life
She delivered her first child in September 2012, and her second in November 2014.

Works

DVDs 
 [2004.12.24] Eternal
 [2005.03.25] Lesson 2
 [2005.06.20] Healing Venus
 [2005.10.28] Aqua
 [2005.12.25] Ando Sayaka Collection Box
 [2006.04.21] Fascino
 [2006/08/22] Toi Kimi no Kioku
 [2007/02/16] Duet
 [2007/10/26] Day
 [2007/12/19] Night
 [2008/03/12] Poison

Photobooks 
[2005.04.xx] Mitsu no A

Sources 
 Sayaka Ando at the Japanese Idol Directory

See also 
List of Race Queens
Sayaka Ando fan website

References

External links 
 

1981 births
Living people
People from Takasaki, Gunma
People from Sendai
Japanese gravure idols
Japanese female models